Fear of a Brown Planet Returns is a 2011 Australian concert film directed by Danielle Karalus with Australian comedy duo Aamer Rahman and Nazeem Hussain.

Production and release
The film features the "best of" material from Aamer Rahman and Nazeem Hussain's 2010 festival show, Fear of a Brown Planet Returns, and content from their debut shows. It was recorded at the Chapel Off Chapel in Melbourne on 15 January 2011 and released on DVD and Blu-ray on 31 August 2011.

References

2011 films
2011 comedy films
Australian comedy films
Stand-up comedy concert films
Religious comedy films
Islamic comedy and humor
2010s English-language films
2010s Australian films